Edgar Degas French artist.

Degas may also refer to:
 Degas (crater), a crater on Mercury
 DEGAS (software), a bitmap graphics editor
 Degas, Iran, a village in Kerman Province, Iran
 Degasification or degas, the removal of gas from liquids

See also
 Dega (disambiguation)